Xellia ApS is a Danish multinational pharmaceutical and life sciences company headquartered in Copenhagen specialized in the production of anti-biotics, including Vancomycin and Bacitracin.

The company's US base of operations is in Buffalo Grove, Illinois, with additional facilities in Ohio, and North Carolina. In 2018, Xellia's sales in the United States accounted for 60% of its total revenue.

Products 
The company's main output is bulk drug chemicals which are wholesaled to other companies for packaging and distribution. Recently some prepackaged goods have been produced.

Active drug substances manufactured are:

Discontinued products 
Previously the company also produced:

Partnerships

In 2019, Xellia partnered with Civica Rx to produce generic Vancomycin and Daptomycin. The partnership's stated aim is to remedy chronic drug shortages that have affected the American pharmaceutical market.

China-US Trade War

Xellia has been discussed as a potential alternative to Chinese companies for anti-biotic primary ingredients in the context of the China-United States trade war.

See also
 List of Danish companies
 List of pharmaceutical companies

References 

Danish brands
Life sciences industry
Biotechnology companies of Denmark
Multinational companies headquartered in Denmark